Abramtsevo is a former country estate and now museum-reserve located north of Moscow, in the proximity of Khotkovo, that became a centre for the Slavophile movement and an artists' colony in the 19th century. The estate is located in the village of Abramtsevo, in Sergiyevo-Posadsky District of Moscow Oblast. The Abramtsevo Museum-reserve site is an object of cultural heritage in Russia.

History
Originally owned by the author Sergei Aksakov, other writers and artists — such as Nikolai Gogol — at first came there as his guests. Under Aksakov, visitors to the estate discussed ways of ridding Russian art of Western influences to revive a purely national style. In 1870, eleven years after Aksakov's death, it was purchased by Savva Mamontov, a wealthy industrialist and patron of the arts.

Under Mamontov, Russian themes and folk art flourished there. During the 1870s and 1880s, Abramtsevo hosted a colony of artists who sought to recapture the quality and spirit of medieval Russian art in a manner parallel to the Arts and Crafts movement in Great Britain. Several workshops were set up there to produce handmade furniture, ceramic tiles, and silks imbued with traditional Russian imagery and themes.

Working together in a cooperative spirit, the artists Vasily Polenov and Viktor Vasnetsov designed a plain but picturesque church, with murals painted by Polenov, Vasnetsov and his brother, a gilded iconostasis by Ilya Repin and Mikhail Nesterov, and folklore-inspired sculptures by Viktor Hartmann and Mark Antokolsky. Towards the turn of the 20th century, drama and opera on Russian folklore themes (e.g., Rimsky-Korsakov's The Snow Maiden) were produced in Abramtsevo by the likes of Konstantin Stanislavsky, with sets contributed by Vasnetsov, Mikhail Vrubel, and other distinguished artists.

Museum
Abramtsevo is now open to the public and tourists can wander along the many paths through the surrounding forest and cross the wooden bridges that served as an inspiration for the artists at the Abramtsevo Colony. They can also visit many of the buildings to see works produced by the artists at the colony, e.g., a wooden bathhouse in the shape of a traditional dwelling of Ancient Rus, designed by Ivan Ropet,  and the House on Chicken Legs, a fairy-tale abode of an evil witch, Baba Yaga, designed by Vasnetsov. One building, the main "manor," is said to have been the model for the estate in which Anton Chekhov set The Cherry Orchard.

Gallery

See also
Aksakov Museum

Further reading
 William Craft Brumfield. The Origins of Modernism in Russian Architecture (Berkeley: University of California Press, 1991)

External links
The Moscow Times on Abramtsevo
Abramtsevo Museum-Reserve, history and facts - [English]

19th-century art groups
Russian artist groups and collectives
Arts and Crafts movement
Decorative arts museums in Russia
Houses in Russia
Museums in Moscow Oblast
Russian art
Cultural heritage monuments of federal significance in Moscow Oblast